The Tsabong Regional Football Association Division One League, also known as the Tsabong Division One or Kgalagadi South Regional Football Association Division One, is one of the regional leagues that make up the third tier of Botswana football. It is administered by the Tsabong Regional Football Association and features teams from in and around Tsabong.

The Tsabong Division One was not played from 2007 until it was revived by former Botswana Football Association president Tebogo Sebego in 2012.

Past seasons

References

Football leagues in Botswana